CBS 10 may refer to:

Network 10, an Australian television network owned by Paramount Global

United States television stations
KFDA-TV, Amarillo, Texas
KLFY-TV, Lafayette, Louisiana
KOLN; Lincoln, Nebraska
KOLR-TV, Springfield, Missouri
KTVL, Medford, Oregon
KWTX-TV, Waco, Texas
KZTV, Corpus Christi, Texas
WBNS-TV, Columbus, Ohio
WTAJ-TV, Altoona, Pennsylvania
WTHI-TV, Terre Haute, Indiana
WTSP-TV, Tampa, Florida

Formerly affiliated
KSAZ-TV, Phoenix, Arizona (affiliated with CBS from 1953 to 1994; now a Fox owned-and-operated station)
KXTV, Sacramento, California (affiliated with CBS from 1955 to 1995, now an ABC affiliate)
WBIR-TV, Knoxville, Tennessee (affiliated with CBS from 1956 to 1988, now an NBC affiliate)
WBNB-TV, U.S. Virgin Islands (affiliated with CBS from 1961 to 1989, now defunct)
WCAU, Philadelphia, PA (affiliated with CBS from 1946 to 1995, now an NBC owned-and-operated station)
WHEC-TV, Rochester, New York (affiliated with CBS from 1953 to 1989, now an NBC affiliate)
WILM-LD, Wilmington, North Carolina (affiliated with CBS from 2000 to 2016; now an independent station)